James or Jim Leslie may refer to:
 James Leslie (bishop) (died 1695), Anglican bishop in Ireland
 James Leslie (Canadian politician) (1786–1873), Canadian businessman and politician
 James Leslie (engineer) (1801–1889), Scottish civil engineer
 James Leslie (footballer) (1908–1980), Scottish footballer with Kilmarnock
 James Leslie (British politician) (1958–2009), former MLA for North Antrim
 James Graham Leslie (1868–1949), Northern Irish politician, Lord Lieutenant of Antrim
 Jim Leslie (businessman) (1922–2012), Australian businessman, chairman of Qantas, chancellor of Deakin University
 Jim Leslie (footballer) (fl. 1890s), Scottish footballer with Clyde and Sunderland
 Jim Leslie (journalist) (1937–1976), journalist and public relations executive assassinated in 1976

See also
Sir James Lesley, also spelled Leslie; soldier
 James Lesslie (1802–1885), Ontario bookseller, reform politician and newspaper publisher